Isabelle Olsson (born 15 April 1993) is a Swedish former figure skater. She is a two-time medalist on the ISU Challenger Series – having won silver at the 2014 Ice Challenge and gold at the 2015 Denkova-Staviski Cup – and a four-time Swedish national medalist. She has won twelve other senior international medals and reached the free skate at three ISU Championships.

Personal life
Isabelle Olsson was born on 15 April 1993 in Karlskrona, Sweden. The daughter of Susanne and Ulf Olsson, she has a twin brother, Johannes, and a sister, Angelica, who is older by one and a half years. Her sister is a former competitive figure skater and their mother coaches figure skating.

Career

2008 to 2012 
Olsson debuted on the ISU Junior Grand Prix (JGP) series in 2008. In the 2009–10 season, she won a bronze medal at JGP Lake Placid and the Swedish national junior title. She was selected to represent Sweden at the 2011 World Junior Championships in Gangneung, South Korea. Her placement of 13th in the short program allowed her to advance to the free skate where she ranked 24th, dropping her to 24th overall.

Olsson ended her junior career after competing at a pair of JGP events in October 2011. The following month, she made her senior international debut, placing fifth at the Crystal Skate of Romania. In February 2012, she won bronze medals at the Bavarian Open and The Nordics.

2012–13 season 
In the 2012–13 season, Olsson won silver medals at the International Cup of Nice and Ice Challenge, followed by gold at the Warsaw Cup and bronze at the Swedish Championships. The following season, she repeated as the national bronze medalist and was sent to the 2014 European Championships, where Sweden was allowed three ladies' entries. Ranked 22nd in the short program and 15th in the free skate, she finished 16th overall at Europeans, which took place in January in Budapest, Hungary. In March 2014, she won gold at the International Challenge Cup in The Hague, Netherlands.

2014–15 season 
Olsson competed at three 2014–15 ISU Challenger Series events, winning silver at the 2014 Ice Challenge. She was awarded the bronze medal at the Swedish Championships.

2015–16 season 
In the 2015–16 season, Olsson scored personal bests in the free skate and combined score to win the gold medal at a Challenger Series event, the 2015 Denkova-Staviski Cup, with a margin of 1.01 over silver medalist Angelīna Kučvaļska. She was invited to compete at her first-ever Grand Prix event, 2015 Skate Canada International, as a replacement for Elene Gedevanishvili, who withdrew from the event; Olsson placed 11th in both segments and 12th overall. After winning the silver medal at the Swedish Championships, she was named in the Swedish team to the 2016 European Championships in Bratislava, Slovakia. There she qualified for the final after placing 23rd in the short program. She placed 24th in the free program and overall.

Programs

Results 
GP: Grand Prix; CS: Challenger Series; JGP: Junior Grand Prix

References

External links 

 
 Isabelle Olsson at Tracings

1993 births
Swedish female single skaters
Living people
People from Karlskrona
Sportspeople from Blekinge County
21st-century Swedish women